Túwaqachi (The Fourth World) is the eighteenth solo album by American composer Bill Laswell, released on November 27, 2012 by M.O.D. Technologies. It was composed by Laswell as an alternative film score to Godfrey Reggio's 1982 experimental film Koyaanisqatsi. With the blessing of the director, an edited version of the film along with the alternative score are intended to be played together in a live setting.

Track listing

Personnel 
James Dellatacoma – assistant engineer
Bill Laswell – bass guitar, drum programming, effects, producer
Robert Musso – engineering

Release history

References

External links 
 Túwaqachi (The Fourth World) at Discogs (list of releases)
 Túwaqachi (The Fourth World) at Bandcamp

2012 albums
Bill Laswell albums
Albums produced by Bill Laswell
M.O.D. Technologies albums